Jonathan Anderson & Edwin Low, known as Anderson & Low are fine art photographers who have been collaborating since 1990.

Anderson & Low are recognised for their studies of athletes and for projects about costume and identity, which have been exhibited worldwide. These include: Road to 2012, Athletes, Circus, Gymnasts/NDGT, Athlete/Warrior, Endure - they are the only artists ever to be given unrestricted access to depict how the Chinese elite gymnasts train for the Olympics; and  Manga Dreams - exploring concepts of identity and the influence of Asian comic books on youth culture.

Anderson & Low's work includes portraiture, architectural studies, abstract images, reportage, nudes, and landscape and is noted for attention to concept, form, lighting and printing.

Their works reside in: The Metropolitan Museum of Art, New York; Victoria & Albert Museum, London, UK; National Portrait Gallery (Australia); National Portrait Gallery, London; Museum of Fine Arts, Houston, Houston, Texas; High Museum of Art, Atlanta, Georgia; The Baltimore Museum of Art; The Science Museum London, UK;  Akron Art Museum, Akron, Ohio; National Gallery of Australia, Canberra, Australia; the US Olympic Center; the Southeast Museum of Photography, Daytona, Florida; Maison Européenne de la Photographie, Paris, France; Brandts Museum of Photographic Art, Odense, Denmark.

September 2015, Anderson & Low were awarded an Honorary Fellowship of the Royal Photographic Society.

March 2017, Anderson & Low exhibition 'Voyages', was premiered at the Science Museum, London. To create this project, Anderson & Low created painting-like images of the museum's historic collection of model ships, making the models resemble real ships at sea.

June 2017, Anderson & Low presented a TEDx talk titled 'Sharpening Your Senses'.

Publications
VOYAGES: Lucky Panda Press, 2017 
On the Set of James Bond's SPECTRE: Hatje Cantz, 2016 
City of Mines: Dewi Lewis Publishing, 2015 
The Queen's Backyard: Dewi Lewis Publishing, 2015 Black Sand - Surfers in Taiwan: Lucky Panda Press, 2014 ENDURE - An intimate Journey with the Chinese Gymnasts: Serindia Publications, 2012 
 Family Intimacies: NuS Museum, Singapore 2012Manga Dreams: Lucky Panda Press, 2011 Champions - to benefit the Elton John AIDS Foundation: Lucky Panda Press, 2008 Circus: Lucky Panda Press, 2008 Athlete/Warrior: Merrell Publishers Ltd, 2005 Gymnasts: Twin Palms Publishing, 2002 Athletes'': Twin Palms Publishing, 2002

Collections
USA
 Metropolitan Museum of Art, New York, New York, USA
 Museum of Fine Arts, Houston, Texas, USA
 High Museum of Art, Atlanta, Georgia, USA
 The Baltimore Art Museum, Baltimore, Maryland, USA
 Worcester Museum, Worcester, Massachusetts, USA
 South East Photography Museum, Daytona Beach, Florida, USA
 Akron Art Museum, Akron, Ohio, USA
 Colorado Springs Fine Art Center, Colorado Springs, Colorado, USA
 United States Olympic Center, Colorado Springs, Colorado, USA
 Palm Springs Art Museum, Palm Springs, California, USA
 Hood Museum of Art, Dartmouth College, New Hampshire, USA

UK
 Victoria & Albert Museum, London, UK
 National Portrait Gallery, London, UK
 Sainsbury Centre for Visual Arts, Norwich, UK
 The Science Museum, London, UK

France
 Maison Européenne de la Photographie, Paris, France

Denmark
 Brandts Museet Fotokunst, Odense, Denmark

Australia
 National Gallery of Australia, Canberra, Australia
 National Portrait Gallery, Canberra, Australia

Malaysia
 Balai Seni Lukis Negara (National Art Gallery) Kuala Lumpur, Malaysia

References

20th-century British photographers
21st-century British photographers